Den Danske Pioneer (The Danish Pioneer) is the oldest Danish-language newspaper published in the United States. Den Danske Pioneer is one of two remaining Danish-language newspapers in the United States. The other is Bien (Danish for "the bee"), a weekly newspaper based in California.

History
Den Danske Pioneer was founded in 1872 by Mark Hansen. Originally, the newspaper was published in Omaha, Nebraska and 75 percent of its subscribers were Danish-American farmers. Sophus Frederik Neble served as  Editor from 1887 to 1931. Sophus Neble was a journeyman printer who had immigrated to the United States in 1883 from Stubbekøbing, Denmark.

Den Danske Pioneer secured a new press at the Chicago Exposition in 1893. The press that was capable of printing 6,000 pages an hour. In 1903 the staff of Den Danske Pioneer numbered 16 and the newspaper moved into newly built offices in Omaha. The Pioneer was developing and becoming the voice of the ethnic community. Datelines for stories were spread across the Midwest and journalist were sent as far east as Maine and Vermont in order to get stories.

In 1958 the newspaper relocated to Elmwood Park, Illinois, where it was published until 1984. Hjalmar Bertelsen served as Editor from 1958 until 1981. Queen Margrethe II of Denmark visited the newspaper's Elmwood Park facilities during her visit to the United States in 1976.  In 1997, Queen Margrethe II made then-editor Chris Steffensen a Knight of the Order of Dannebrog to commemorate the newspaper's 125th anniversary.

Today the newspaper is a unit of Bertelsen Publishing Co., based in Hoffman Estates, Illinois.  Elsa Steffensen, wife of former editor Chris Steffensen, is publisher, and their daughter Linda Steffensen is editor.

See also 
 Danes in Omaha, Nebraska

References

Other sources
Marzolf, Marion  The Danish-Language Press in America (New York: Arno Press. 1979)

External links
 Den Danske Pioneer on the Web

Danish-American history
Danish-language newspapers published in the United States
History of Omaha, Nebraska
Publications established in 1872
Newspapers published in Omaha, Nebraska
Newspapers published in Illinois
Danish-American culture in Omaha, Nebraska
Non-English-language newspapers published in Nebraska